Ivashko is a Ukrainian surname that may refer to:

 Markiyan Ivashko (born 1979), Ukrainian archer
 Petr Ivashko (born 1971), Belarusian biathlete
 Ruslan Ivashko (born 1986), Ukrainian footballer
 Vladimir Ivashko (1932–1994), Soviet and Ukrainian statesman, acting General Secretary of the Communist Party of the Soviet Union in 1991

See also
 

Ukrainian-language surnames